Johnson County is a county located in the U.S. state of Texas. As of the 2020 census, its population was 179,927. Its county seat is Cleburne. Johnson County is named for Middleton Johnson, a Texas Ranger, soldier, and politician. Johnson County is included in the Dallas–Fort Worth–Arlington metropolitan statistical area.

History
The first settler of Johnson County was Henry Briden, who built a log cabin on the Nolan River in 1849. His log cabin still exists, and can be seen along State Highway 174 in Rio Vista, Texas. The first county seat was Wardville, now located under the waters of Lake Pat Cleburne. In 1856,  Buchanan became the county seat. Johnson County was divided in 1866, with the western half becoming Hood County. Camp Henderson became the new county seat and was renamed Cleburne in honor of Confederate General Patrick Cleburne.

Geography

Major highways
 
 
  U.S. Highway 67
  U.S. Highway 287
  U.S. Highway 377
  State Highway 81
  State Highway 171
  State Highway 174

Adjacent counties

 Tarrant County (north)
 Dallas County (northeast)
 Ellis County (east)
 Hill County (south)
 Bosque County (southwest)
 Somervell County (southwest)
 Hood County (west)
 Parker County (northwest)

Communities

Cities (multiple counties) 
 Burleson (small part in Tarrant County)
 Cresson (partly in Hood and Parker counties)
 Crowley (mostly in Tarrant County)
 Fort Worth (mostly in Tarrant County, with small parts in Denton, Parker, Wise, and Johnson counties)
 Mansfield (mostly in Tarrant County and a small part in Ellis County)

Cities 

 Alvarado
 Briaroaks
 Cleburne (county seat)
 Coyote Flats
 Godley
 Grandview
 Joshua
 Keene
 Rio Vista

Towns
 Cross Timber
 Venus (small part in Ellis County)

Census-designated place
 The Homesteads, Texas

Unincorporated communities
 Bono
 Egan
 Lillian
 Parker

Demographics

Note: the US Census treats Hispanic/Latino as an ethnic category. This table excludes Latinos from the racial categories and assigns them to a separate category. Hispanics/Latinos can be of any race.

As of the census of 2000,  126,811 people, 43,636 households, and 34,428 families resided in the county.  The population density was 174 people per square mile (67/km2).  The 46,269 housing units averaged 63 per square mile (24/km2).  The racial makeup of the county was 90.01% White, 2.50% African American, 0.64% Native American, 0.52% Asian, 0.18% Pacific Islander, 4.52% from other races, and 1.63% from two or more races.  About 12.12% of the population was Hispanic  or Latino of any race.

Of the 43,636 households, 39.50% had children under the age of 18 living with them, 64.70% were married couples living together, 10.00% had a female householder with no husband present, and 21.10% were not families. About 17.30% of the households were made up of individuals, and 6.90% had someone living alone who was 65 years of age or older.  The average household size was 2.85 and the average family size was 3.20. As of the 2010 census, about 3.6 same-sex couples  occurred per 1,000 households in the county.

In the county, the age distribution was 28.80% under the age of 18, 8.80% from 18 to 24, 30.20% from 25 to 44, 22.30% from 45 to 64, and 10.00% who were 65 years of age or older.  The median age was 34 years. For every 100 females, there were 99.70 males.  For every 100 females age 18 and over, there were 97.10 males.

The median income for a household in the county was $44,621, and for a family was $49,963. Males had a median income of $36,718 versus $25,149 for females. The per capita income for the county was $18,400.  About 6.90% of families and 8.80% of the population were below the poverty line, including 10.60% of those under age 18 and 10.90% of those age 65 or over.

Education
School districts include:
 Alvarado Independent School District
 Burleson Independent School District
 Cleburne Independent School District
 Crowley Independent School District
 Godley Independent School District
 Granbury Independent School District
 Grandview Independent School District
 Joshua Independent School District
 Keene Independent School District
 Mansfield Independent School District
 Rio Vista Independent School District
 Venus Independent School District

Hill College a college in Hillsboro, a town in neighboring Hill County also provides tertiary education, with a campus in Cleburne since 1971. Johnson County is defined by the Texas Education Code as being in the Hill College service area.

Southwestern Adventist University, a private liberal arts university in Keene, is currently the only four-year institution of higher learning in Johnson County.  Southwestern is affiliated with the Seventh-day Adventist Church and has existed since 1893.

Media
Johnson County is part of the Dallas/Fort Worth television media market in north-central Texas. Local news media outlets are: KDFW-TV, KXAS-TV, WFAA-TV, KTVT-TV, KERA-TV, KTXA-TV, KDFI-TV, KDAF-TV, KFWD-TV, and KDTX-TV. KCLE is the local radio station, which offers local news in addition to its country-music format. The local newspapers are the Cleburne Times-Review, Burleson Star and Joshua Star.

Politics

See also

 Johnson County Courthouse
 List of museums in North Texas
 National Register of Historic Places listings in Johnson County, Texas
 Recorded Texas Historic Landmarks in Johnson County
 DeWayne Burns, state representative from Johnson and Bosque counties, effective 2015

References

External links

 Official Johnson County, Texas website
 Johnson County in Handbook of Texas Online at the University of Texas

 
Dallas–Fort Worth metroplex
1854 establishments in Texas
Populated places established in 1854